The Martin Luther King Jr. Library may refer to:

 Martin Luther King Jr. Branch of the Oakland Public Library in Oakland, California
 Martin Luther King Jr. Library of the Sacramento Public Library in Sacramento, California
 Dr. Martin Luther King Jr. Library in San Jose, California
 Martin Luther King Jr. Memorial Library in Washington, D.C.
 Dr. Martin Luther King Jr. Library of the Brevard County Libraries in Melbourne, Florida
 Martin Luther King Jr. Library of the Atlanta–Fulton Public Library System in Atlanta
 Martin Luther King Jr. Library of the Chicago Public Library in Chicago
 Martin Luther King Jr. Branch of the New Orleans Public Library in New Orleans
 Martin Luther King Jr. Library at Boston University in Boston
 Martin Luther King Jr. Memorial Library at Syracuse University in Syracuse, New York
 Martin Luther King Jr. Branch of the Cleveland Public Library in Cleveland, Ohio
 Martin Luther King Jr. Library and Learning Center of the Dallas Public Library in Dallas, Texas
 Dr. Martin Luther King Jr. Library of the Tacoma Public Library in Tacoma, Washington
 Martin Luther King Jr. Branch of the Columbus Metropolitan Library in Columbus, Ohio
 Martin Luther King Jr. Branch of the  Milwaukee Public Library in Milwaukee, Wisconsin